Inside Out is a 2011 American crime film directed by Artie Mandelberg. The film features professional wrestler Triple H (credited as Paul "Triple H" Levesque), Michael Rapaport, Parker Posey, Julie White, Michael Cudlitz and Bruce Dern. The project was the cinematic feature film debut for director Artie Mandelberg.  The film was released on September 9, 2011.

Plot
A.J., an ex-con who served 13 years in Angola for manslaughter, returns home to New Orleans and fights to protect the woman he loves and her young daughter from his dangerous former best friend. In better times, AJ (Triple H) would have done anything to protect his best friend, Jack (Michael Rapaport), a two-bit gangster and the son of Dr. Vic (Bruce Dern) -- the city's toughest crime boss. While A.J. is in prison, Jack marries Claire (Parker Posey), the love of AJ's life, and together they raise a daughter, Pepper (Juliette Goglia). Pepper is A.J.'s daughter, a fact known to Jack, but Jack pretends to be her biological father. The day Jack picks up AJ from prison, the short-fused thug gets an itchy trigger finger that could land his buddy right back behind bars. The situation grows increasingly tense as Dr. Vic attempts to handle the situation quietly as he comes under investigation by the Louisiana Tax Board agent Martha (Julie White) for dealing in untaxed cigarettes. When Jack flees and Dr. Vic decides that the only way to get the job done right is to do it himself, A.J. realizes that Claire and Pepper are in mortal danger, and races to their rescue.

Cast

Reception
On review aggregator Rotten Tomatoes, the film holds an approval rating of 25% based on 12 reviews, with an average rating of 2.66/10. On Metacritic, the film has a weighted average score of 28 out of 100, based on 8 critics, indicating "generally unfavorable reviews".

Writing for The New York Times, Daniel M. Gold described the plot as "a tangle of dithering storylines" and Levesque's acting as "inert". The New York Post'''s Lou Lumenick derided Inside Out as "nonsensical, thickly plotted gumbo" which he found to be unintentionally funnier than Levesque's other starring role in the comedy film The Chaperone. However, Eric Hynes of The Village Voice'' was more positive, praising the film as a "meandering, eccentric, downright adorable existential crime yarn", while noting that Levesque's performance was closer to "a steroidal Steven Seagal" than "Hackman or Cagney".

References

External links
 
 

American crime drama films
2011 directorial debut films
2011 films
2011 crime drama films
2010s English-language films
Films set in New Orleans
Films shot in New Orleans
WWE Studios films
2010s American films